Hermathena eburna is a species of butterfly in genus Hermathena of the family Riodinidae. This montane forest species is found from Costa Rica to western Ecuador.

References

External links
Tree of Life Web Project: Hermathena eburna
Butterflies of America: Hermathena eburna

Riodinidae
Butterflies described in 2005